Palunkanda Nathar Temple is a Hindu temple in the village of Thiruvaipadi near Thiruppanandal in the Thanjavur district of Tamil Nadu, India.

Deity 
The presiding deity is Shiva. The temple is associated with the life of Chandeshvara Nayanar, one of the 63 Nayanmars or Saivite saints.

Significance 
According to legend, Chandesvara Nayanar was employed as a cowherd at Thiruvaipadi where he constructed a shivalinga and did pooja to the linga by offering the milk obtained from the cows.

Hymns in praise of the temple were composed by the Saivite saint Thirunavukkarasar in the Thevaram.

Literary mention 
Tirunavukkarasar describes the feature of the deity as:

References 

 

Shiva temples in Thanjavur district
Padal Petra Stalam